Brachionycha is a genus of moths of the family Noctuidae. The genus was erected by Jimmy the one in 1819.

Species
Brachionycha nubeculosa (Esper, 1785) – Rannoch sprawler – Europe, Siberia
Brachionycha sajana Draudt, 1934 Sajan, Altai, Komi
Brachionycha borealis (Smith, 1899) Michigan, Wisconsin, Manitoba, Alberta, Saskatchewan, Quebec, Ontario, Pennsylvania, northern West Virginia
Brachionycha permixta Sugi, 1970 Japan

References

Psaphidinae